The 1991 Amílcar Cabral Cup was held in Dakar, Senegal.

Group stage

Group A

Group B

Knockout stage

Semi-finals

Cape Verde won on penalty shootout.

Final

References
Details in RSSSF archives

Amílcar Cabral Cup